"Thicker than Water" is the third Christmas special episode of the BBC sitcom, Only Fools and Horses, broadcast on 25 December 1983, and is the first to be screened on Christmas Day.

Synopsis
Rodney and Grandad are watching television on Christmas Day, when a stranger appears at the door. The stranger turns out to be Del Boy and Rodney's father (and Grandad's son) Reg, who had abandoned them 18 years earlier after the death of their mother. When Del learns of Reg's return he intends to eject him, but Rodney and Grandad persuade Del to give him a chance. Reg tells his family that he has been living in Newcastle and has recently been diagnosed with a hereditary blood disorder.

Del and Rodney quickly take blood tests, which both turn out negative when they receive their results on New Year's Eve, but Grandad notices on their results that they have different blood types. Grandad explains that around the time that Rodney was born, Reg and their mother Joan were having frequent arguments, and Joan flirted with other men. Del and Grandad thus both assume that Rodney has a different father and tell him the news, with Del concluding that Rodney is a "whodunnit". However, when Reg returns having checked his own and Grandad's blood groups, he reveals that it is in fact Del who has the alien blood group.

The next day, New Year's Day, Del is drinking alone at The Nag's Head while Reg moves in permanently, wearing Del's clothes, spending time with Rodney and taunting Del for being a "lone ranger".

Whenever he passes Del in the corridor, Reg calls out "Hi-ho silver!" at him. Rodney reassures Del that children with the same parents can have different blood groups and recommends that he visit Dr Becker, the Trotter family's doctor, again to clarify the results. Del at first refuses, as Dr Becker treated their mother and he does not want him to realise that she was seeing different men. It is when Reg taunts Del yet again by calling him “Ke-mo sah-bee”, (another Lone Ranger reference), when dealing him his cards for a game of Pontoon, he changes his mind.

Later that evening, Reg is clearly outstaying his welcome at the flat, having spent all of Rodney and Grandad's money, drunk all their beer, and written a bet on one of Rodney's GCE certificates.

Del returns home and reveals that he took Rodney's advice and visited Dr Becker again, who confirmed that different blood groups are not indicative of different parentage, and in any case, Del's blood type was actually "A" and not "AB" as recorded on the results, and that someone – Reg – had altered them in an attempt to isolate Del and take his place in Nelson Mandela House. Furthermore, Dr Becker made some background checks, which found that Reg was actually a porter at the Newcastle infirmary, not a patient, and is on the run after stealing numerous items from the hospital, including the chief gynaecologist's Lambretta scooter. All but defeated, Reg decides to leave, and the Trotters are glad to see the back of him, although Del still gives him some money on his way out. Rodney apologises to Del for not believing him about Reg's character. The episode ends as Grandad burns Del's pizza.

Episode cast

Production 
This is the only episode of Only Fools and Horses to feature Reg Trotter. Peter Woodthorpe was cast because of his resemblance to David Jason, although Jason himself claimed he could not see any likeness. The manner of Reg's departure meant that John Sullivan thought it impossible for the character to return because "he'd blotted his copybook so badly that I couldn't see Del ever accepting him again". Reg was later a main character in the Fools prequel Rock & Chips, as played by Shaun Dingwall.

This official episode was the final appearance of Grandad but his last appearance came in the educational feature "Licensed to Drill" which was shown in schools from 1984 onwards. Actor Lennard Pearce died during production of the next series.

The original airing of this episode included a brief exchange where Del reminds Rodney that Reg was not aware if Grandad was alive or dead in the eighteen years he'd been gone, and Rodney comments that they never seem to know either. Following Lennard Pearce's death less than a year later this exchange was removed from the episode, with it not being restored for any subsequent airing or home media release. However, it remains intact on the iTunes release and this scene is an extreme rarity.

Notes 

 The episode title comes from the proverb blood is thicker than water, highlighted by the appearance of Del and Rodney's father, Reg.

Story arc
 This episode hints that Del and Rodney does not share the same father, because Del's father Reg is not Rodney's biological father. The mystery continues in "The Frog's Legacy", only this time the suggestion is that it is actually Rodney who was the product of an affair between their mother Joan and gangster Freddie Robdal (aka "Freddie the Frog"). This is confirmed in the final episode to date of the series "Sleepless in Peckham", and is the central plot of the first episode of the 2010 prequel series "Rock & Chips" in which Freddie (played by Nicholas Lyndhurst) has the affair with Joan and conceives Rodney.

Soundtrack
Music from the film Sleepless Nights

References

External links

1983 British television episodes
British Christmas television episodes
Only Fools and Horses special episodes